The Warrington hammer is a common woodworking tool that falls under the cross-peen category of hammers. The chisel-like cross-peen side of the hammer is used to set small nails and pins while the smaller, rounded face is used to finish driving in the aforementioned nail. The cross-peen side of the tool is also used for refining work, such as furniture and cabinet making. While the standard claw hammer would be more used for tasks that involve greater use of force, the Warrington hammer is preferred for projects that require precision, hence its prevalence in the art of woodworking. The most common length of a standard Warrington hammer is around twelve and a half inches in length with the hammer head weighing between ten to fourteen ounces.

Primary use 
The primary usage of the hammer involves holding the target nail in between the index finger and the thumb and then proceeding to use the cross-peen side of the hammer to set the nail. However, the unique design of this hammer allows for a multitude of other uses such as correcting a bent nail or even using the head as a makeshift anvil.

History 
The history of the tool dates back to the mid-1800s with its name most likely coming from the town of Warrington in England. Depending on location, the Warrington hammer could also be known as a Joiners hammer or a Cabinetmaker hammer.

Parts of the Warrington Hammer 
Head - The metal top of the hammer, typically made of steel.

Face - The round striking surface on the end of the hammer.

Peen - The chisel-like edge on the reverse side of the face.

Handle - The shaft used to grip the tool. Typically made of wood.

Hammers
Woodworking hand tools